The 2011 Northern Ireland Assembly election took place on Thursday, 5 May, following the dissolution of the Northern Ireland Assembly at midnight on 24 March 2011.  It was the fourth election to take place since the devolved assembly was established in 1998.

It was held on the same day as elections for Northern Ireland's 26 local councils, the Scottish Parliament and Welsh Assembly elections, a number of local elections in England and the United Kingdom Alternative Vote referendum. As in the past, the 2011 election to the Assembly was conducted using the single transferable vote (STV) system of proportional representation. The 108 seats were contested in 18 constituencies by 218 candidates, including 15 independents and the nominees of 14 separate political parties.

1,210,009 individuals were registered to vote in the 2011 Assembly election (representing an increase of 9.2% compared to the 2007 Assembly election). Turnout in the 2011 Assembly election was 55.7%, a decline of almost seven percentage points from the previous Assembly election and down over 14 percentage points from the first election to the Assembly in 1998.

As in the 2007 election, the Democratic Unionist Party (DUP) and Sinn Féin (SF) remained the two largest parties in the Assembly, with the DUP winning 38 and Sinn Féin winning 29 of the Assembly's 108 seats.  The Ulster Unionist Party (UUP) won 16 seats, the Social Democratic and Labour Party (SDLP) 14 and the Alliance 8, while one seat each was won by the Green Party, Traditional Unionist Voice (TUV) and an independent candidate.

Following the results of the election, Peter Robinson of the DUP and Martin McGuinness of Sinn Féin were nominated and subsequently re-elected as First Minister and deputy First Minister on 12 May 2011. The sole change to the Northern Ireland Executive was that the UUP lost a ministerial post to the Alliance.

Overview
The election was the first since the devolution of policing and justice powers to the assembly. In contrast to previous elections, it was relatively uncontroversial. The turnout was one of the lowest ever in a Northern Ireland election.
Sinn Féin and the Democratic Unionist Party both continued to make gains, although the DUP vote share was slightly down. The election was a disaster for the Ulster Unionist Party, which came behind the Social Democratic and Labour Party in terms of first preference vote, although the UUP won more seats. The Ulster Unionist vote collapsed in Belfast, where it was eclipsed by the Alliance Party's, and in a number of other constituencies considered safe such as North Down. The election was also poor for the SDLP, which lost two seats.
 
The Alliance Party performed well, gaining a second seat in East Belfast (which a former Progressive Unionist Party member lost and the PUP failed to regain), while increasing the Alliance vote share significantly. Traditional Unionist Voice secured a single seat in North Antrim; its vote share was down from the May 2010 elections to the UK Parliament. Despite their first preference vote halving, the Green Party held their sole seat in North Down while the People before Profit Alliance narrowly failed to take the final seat in the Foyle constituency. The only member elected as an independent in 2007 (in West Tyrone) retired, leaving a single independent in the new Assembly (after three independents first elected on other tickets had retired or lost re-election), compared to five at the end of the previous one.

Results

As in the previous Assembly, the DUP's voting strength was reduced by one with the re-election on 12 May of Willie Hay (DUP, Foyle) to the non-partisan office of Speaker.

Ten seats on the Northern Ireland Executive were filled by the new Assembly on 16 May according to party strength under the d'Hondt method of proportional representation.

In addition, in separate votes on 12 and 16 May, the Assembly as a whole re-elected party leaders David Ford (Alliance), Peter Robinson (DUP) and Martin McGuinness (Sinn Féin) to their seats on the Executive as, respectively, Minister of Justice and First Minister and deputy First Minister. Thus the Executive's total membership, as in the past, is 13.

Numbers as reported by Wednesday, 11 May 2011.

Constituency results

Distribution of seats by constituency

Party affiliation of the six Assembly members returned by each constituency. The first column indicates the party of the Member of the House of Commons (MP) returned by the corresponding parliamentary constituency in the general election of 6 May 2010 (under the "first past the post" method).

(The constituencies are arranged here in rough geographical order around Lough Neagh from Antrim to Londonderry. To see them in alphabetical order, click the small square icon after "Constituency"; to restore this geographical order, click the icon after "No." at the left.)

 Three of the four independents elected in 1998 ran as Independent Unionists
  NIWC = Northern Ireland Women's Coalition; Prog. U. = Progressive Unionist Party; TUV = Traditional Unionist Voice; UKUP = United Kingdom Unionist Party

Share of first-preference votes
Percentage of each constituency's first-preference votes. Four highest percentages in each constituency shaded; absolute majorities underlined. The constituencies are arranged in the geographic order described for the table above; click the icon next to "Constituency" to see them in alphabetical order. 
[The totals given here are the sum of all valid ballots cast in each constituency, and the percentages are based on such totals. The turnout percentages in the last column, however, are based upon all ballots cast, which also include anything from twenty to a thousand invalid ballots in each constituency. The total valid ballots' percentage of the eligible electorate can correspondingly differ by 0.1% to 2% from the turnout percentage.] 
 

 Independent Unionist vote in 1998 (2.8%) included in the Independent column (not "others"). TUV = Traditional Unionist Voice.

Votes cast for minor parties and independents
Out of the 22 candidates from the seven parties which won no seats in 2011, the four candidates who won more than 1,000 first-preference votes (and more than 4% of the total first preferences) in their respective constituencies were:
 Eamonn McCann of the People Before Profit Alliance in Foyle: 3,120 (8.0%),
 Henry Reilly of the UK Independence Party in South Down: 2,332 (5.6%),
 Gerry Carroll of People Before Profit in Belfast West: 1,661	(4.8%), and
 Brian Ervine of the Progressive Unionist Party in Belfast East: 1,493 (4.6%)

Three-fifths, or 8,606 (60%), of the 14,338 first preferences cast for the seven minor parties went to these four candidates.

Of the 15 independent candidates, running in 9 separate constituencies, the 8 who won more than 1,000 first-preference votes (and over 2.5% of the first-preference total) were:
 David McClarty, MLA, formerly Ulster Unionist, re-elected in East Londonderry:  3,003	(8.6%),
 Alan McFarland, MLA, formerly Ulster Unionist, defeated in North Down:	1,879 (6.7%),
 Alan Chambers, also losing in North Down:	1,765	(6.3%),
 Dawn Purvis, MLA, formerly Progressive Unionist, defeated in Belfast East (see above): 1,702	(5.3%),
 Paul McFadden in Foyle: 1,280	(3.3%),
 Raymond McCord in Belfast North: 1,176 (3.5%),
 Paddy McGowan	in West Tyrone:	1,145	(2.9%), and
 Eugene McMenamin, also in West Tyrone:	1,096	(2.8%)

A majority (8,395 or 54%) of the 15,535 first-preference votes cast for independents went to the first four of these candidates, three of whom had been elected by other parties in 2007. David McClarty was the only successful independent candidate.

Seats changing hands
The Alliance gained a seat in Belfast East (from Dawn Purvis, an independent elected as a Progressive Unionist). Net gain +1.
The Democratic Unionist Party gained seats from the UUP in Belfast North and North Down, but lost one to the UUP in Strangford. The DUP also gained seats in the Lagan Valley (from SF) and South Antrim (from SDLP), but lost a seat in West Tyrone (to UUP or SDLP). Net gain +2.
An independent elected in 2007 from West Tyrone did not run again in 2011 (seat won by SDLP or DUP). An Ulster Unionist elected in 2007 from East Londonderry, who was not re-nominated by his party, won election in 2011 as an independent. (After his re-election, he decided to remain an independent outside the UUP.) Three other independents elected in 2007 by different parties were not returned in 2011: a former Ulster Unionist in North Down (to DUP), a former Progressive Unionist in Belfast East (to Alliance), and a former Sinn Féin member in Fermanagh & South Tyrone (regained by SF). No net change from 2007; net change from the outgoing Assembly: 
The Progressive Unionist Party elected a single member in 2007 from East Belfast who resigned from the party in 2010 (and whose seat was gained by the Alliance in 2011). The PUP failed to elect its only candidate in 2011. Net change from 2007 –1; no net change from the outgoing Assembly.
Sinn Féin gained seats in East Antrim (from UUP) and Fermanagh & South Tyrone (from SDLP), but lost one in the Lagan Valley (to DUP). It also regained a second seat in Fermanagh & South Tyrone that had been held by an independent originally elected as Sinn Féin. Net gain +2 from the outgoing Assembly and +1 from 2007.
The Social Democratic & Labour Party gained a seat from West Tyrone (from Ind. or DUP) but lost seats in Fermanagh & South Tyrone (to SF), North Antrim (to Traditional Unionist Voice) and South Antrim (to DUP). Net loss –2.
Traditional Unionist Voice won its first and only seat, in North Antrim (from the SDLP). Net gain +1.
The Ulster Unionist Party gained seats in Strangford (from DUP) and West Tyrone (from DUP or Ind.), but lost seats in Belfast North (to DUP) and East Antrim (to SF). Another two members elected as Ulster Unionists in North Down and East Londonderry left the UUP before the 2011 election. Net loss from 2007: –2. (No net change from the outgoing Assembly.)

Turnover in members since 2007
Thirty-one members of the previous Assembly during all of part of its term (2007-2011) did not offer themselves for re-election in May 2011. Another eight who did seek re-election were unsuccessful.

Members who left during the previous Assembly's term

Several of the 14 members who retired early from the Northern Ireland Assembly did so either after being elected or re-elected to the British House of Commons on 6 May 2010 (as MPs), or else in anticipation of being elected to the Dáil Éireann (lower house of the Irish parliament) on 25 February 2011 (as a TD). [Three retired or retiring members are Privy Counsellors of the United Kingdom (PC).]

Changes in membership at the election

These are the 25 changes in membership that occurred between the third Assembly's dissolution in March 2011 and the fourth Assembly's election in May. Seventeen sitting members did not present themselves for re-election and another eight were defeated at the polls. One re-elected member had been elected with a different affiliation in 2007.

The numbers indicate the percentage of votes each member received in the first round of counting under the Single Transferable Vote in the 2011 election, and the round which decided his or her election or defeat.

In some constituencies (Foyle, West Tyrone and Fermanagh & South Tyrone), it is not possible to couple a single outgoing member by party with a single successor. The pairs of outgoing and incoming members in those seats are presented in arbitrary order.

Changes in membership without a change in party

Most of these changes occurred due to a member's retirement, although one defeated member of the SDLP, in Foyle, was succeeded by another member of the SDLP.

Seats changing hands between the parties

Note that the party changes in Lagan Valley, Strangford and East Antrim cancelled each other out.

Member returning with a different affiliation

David McClarty, originally elected from East Londonderry as an Ulster Unionist, although not re-nominated by the UUP in 2011, stood successfully for re-election as an independent. This reduced the UUP's strength from 2007, while keeping independent strength in the Assembly at one (as Kieran Deeny, the retiring independent member, was not succeeded in West Tyrone by another independent). McClarty decided not to re-join the UUP after his re-election.

Speaker
The presiding officer of the Northern Ireland's Assembly (like those for Scotland and Wales, but unlike those for the United Kingdom or the Republic of Ireland) does not remain impartial during the election period. The sitting Speaker, in this instance William Hay (DUP, Foyle), must revert to his or her party colours and campaign for a seat on its manifesto. Once re-elected as an MLA (as Hay was), he or she becomes eligible for re-election as Speaker to resume unbiased authority over the Assembly. The regional media reported that Sinn Féin's Francie Molloy, an outgoing Deputy Speaker, had hoped to win election as Speaker when the 2011 Assembly first met; in the event, following inter-party negotiations, Hay was re-elected and Molloy was nominated by his party for, and elected to, a newly created position of Principal Deputy Speaker with a presumed right of succession.

Party leaders in the Assembly

Electoral administration

Eligibility and proof of identity
European Union (EU) and Commonwealth citizens aged 18 or over on election day were entitled to vote. The deadline for voters to register to vote in 5 May elections was midnight on 14 April 2011.  All voters had to present one piece of photographic identification in order to cast a vote at the polling station: accepted forms of ID were an Electoral Identity Card, a photographic Northern Ireland or Great Britain driving licence, a European Union member state passport, a Translink 60+ SmartPass, a Translink Senior SmartPass, a Translink Blind Person's SmartPass or a Translink War Disabled SmartPass. Voters who didn't have an accepted type of photographic ID had until 22 April 2011 to apply for an Electoral Identity Card from the Electoral Office. A judicial review brought by candidates in the simultaneous local government elections, challenging the non-acceptance of EU national identity cards as a proof of identity, failed on 4 May 2011.

Speed of counting of votes
In the days following the 2011 Assembly election concerns were raised by politicians and others about the time it took for ballots to be verified and counted. The first result came in at 7:00 p.m. on Friday 6 May, nine hours after counting began and 21 hours after polls closed. The announcement of the final results for some constituencies came two days after the polls closed. In contrast, the first result for elections held in Scotland on the same day as the Assembly election came in at 12:54 a.m., just under three hours after counting began, and the final result came in at 5:21 p.m. on the same day (Friday 6 May).  In response to the criticisms about the speed of counting, Northern Ireland's Chief Electoral Officer, Graham Shields, defended the process, saying that it was "about accuracy, not about speed", adding that "This is a complicated process and people have to accept that. We will take as long as it takes to get it right."

See also
Candidates nominated to run for the 2011 election of the Northern Ireland Assembly
4th Northern Ireland Assembly
2011 Irish general election
2011 Northern Ireland local elections
2011 National Assembly for Wales election
2011 Scottish Parliament general election
2011 United Kingdom Alternative Vote referendum

References

External links

Official sites
 Electoral Office for Northern Ireland
 Northern Ireland Assembly

News reports
 Summary and comparison of the principal parties' views on the main issues at the BBC and Ulster TV
 "A view from around the 18 Assembly constituencies", The Belfast Telegraph, Saturday, 7 May 2011 (retrieved 11 May 2011)

Party web sites, manifestoes and election broadcasts
The party election broadcasts (PEBs) in this table are at the BBC News site. Almost every individual party web site below also shows a copy of or a link to at least one of the party's own election broadcasts.

Party leaders' debates
 Televised debate between the leaders of the Alliance, DUP, Sinn Féin, SDLP and UUP on BBC Northern Ireland for 90 minutes on Tuesday 3 May (this link includes a written synopsis)

2011
2011 elections in the United Kingdom
2011 elections in Northern Ireland
May 2011 events in the United Kingdom